Heykel Megannem (born 28 February 1977) is a Tunisian handball player who competed in the 2012 Summer Olympics tournament where Tunisia lost in the quarterfinals. He was also the flag bearer of the Tunisia sports team at the 2012 Summer Olympics opening ceremony.

References

1977 births
Living people
Tunisian male handball players
Olympic handball players of Tunisia
Handball players at the 2000 Summer Olympics
Handball players at the 2012 Summer Olympics